Samuel Edmund Thorne (October 14, 1907 – April 7, 1994) was an American legal historian. The  editor of many English legal manuscripts, he is best known for his translation, with annotations, of Bracton's De legibus et consuetudinibus Angliae (1968-1977), generally considered to be the definitive one.

Thorne was educated at the City College of New York and Harvard Law School. He was librarian and professor at Northwestern University School of Law from 1934 to 1942, when he took a leave of absence to serve in the United States Navy as a cryptoanalyst, achieving the rank of lieutenant commander. After World War II, Thorne joined Yale Law School as librarian in 1945. He was elected to the American Academy of Arts and Sciences in 1956. That same year, Thorne joined Harvard University as Professor of Law and History, and retired in 1978. He was an elected member of the American Philosophical Society.

A festschrift in his honor, On the Laws and Customs of England : Essays in Honor of Samuel E. Thorne, was published in 1981.

Works 

 Bracton, On the Laws and Customs of England, 4 vol. (editor) (1968-1977)
 Essays in English Legal History (1984)

References 

Northwestern University Pritzker School of Law faculty
1994 deaths
Legal historians
American historians
American legal scholars
American librarians
American medievalists
City College of New York alumni
Harvard Law School alumni
Yale Law School faculty
Harvard Law School faculty
United States Navy officers
American cryptographers
1907 births
Fellows of the Medieval Academy of America
Members of the American Philosophical Society
Corresponding Fellows of the British Academy